This is a list of electoral divisions and wards in the ceremonial county of Lancashire in North West England. All changes since the re-organisation of local government following the passing of the Local Government Act 1972 are shown. The number of councillors elected for each electoral division or ward is shown in brackets.

County council

Lancashire
Electoral Divisions from 1 April 1974 (first election 12 April 1973) to 7 May 1981:

Electoral Divisions from 7 May 1981 to 5 May 2005:

Electoral Divisions from 5 May 2005 to 4 May 2017:

† minor boundary changes in 2009

Electoral Divisions from 4 May 2017 to present:

Unitary authority councils

Blackburn with Darwen
Wards from 1 April 1974 (first election 7 June 1973) to 3 May 1979:

Wards from 3 May 1979 to 1 May 1997:

Wards from 1 May 1997 to 10 June 2004:

Wards from 10 June 2004 to 3 May 2018:

Wards from 3 May 2018 to present:

Blackpool
Wards from 1 April 1974 (first election 7 June 1973) to 6 May 1976:

Wards from 6 May 1976 to 1 May 1997:

Wards from 1 May 1997 to 1 May 2003:

Wards from 1 May 2003 to present:

District councils

Burnley
Wards from 1 April 1974 (first election 7 June 1973) to 6 May 1976:

Wards from 6 May 1976 to 2 May 1991:

Wards from 2 May 1991 to 2 May 2002:

Wards from 2 May 2002 to present:

Chorley
Wards from 1 April 1974 (first election 7 June 1973) to 6 May 1976:

Wards from 6 May 1976 to 2 May 2002:

Wards from 2 May 2002 to 6 May 2021:

Wards from 6 May 2021 to present:

Fylde
Wards from 1 April 1974 (first election 7 June 1973) to 6 May 1976:

Wards from 6 May 1976 to 1 May 2003:

Wards from 1 May 2003 to present:

Hyndburn
Wards from 1 April 1974 (first election 7 June 1973) to 3 May 1979:

Wards from 3 May 1979 to 2 May 2002:

Wards from 2 May 2002 to present:

Lancaster
Wards from 1 April 1974 (first election 7 June 1973) to 3 May 1979:

Wards from 3 May 1979 to 1 May 2003:

Wards from 1 May 2003 to 7 May 2015:

Wards from 7 May 2015 to present:

Pendle
Wards from 1 April 1974 (first election 7 June 1973) to 6 May 1976:

Wards from 6 May 1976 to 2 May 2002:

Wards from 2 May 2002 to 6 May 2021:

Wards from 6 May 2021 to present:

Preston
Wards from 1 April 1974 (first election 7 June 1973) to 6 May 1976:

Wards from 6 May 1976 to 3 May 1990:

Wards from 3 May 1990 to 2 May 2002:

Wards from 2 May 2002 to 2 May 2019:

† minor boundary changes in 2007

Wards from 2 May 2019 to present:

Ribble Valley
Wards from 1 April 1974 (first election 7 June 1973) to 6 May 1976:

Wards from 6 May 1976 to 1 May 2003:

Wards from 1 May 2003 to 2 May 2019:

Wards from 2 May 2019 to present:

Rossendale
Wards from 1 April 1974 (first election 7 June 1973) to 6 May 1976:

Wards from 6 May 1976 to 2 May 2002:

Wards from 2 May 2002 to present:

South Ribble
Wards from 1 April 1974 (first election 7 June 1973) to 6 May 1976:

Wards from 6 May 1976 to 7 May 1987:

Wards from 7 May 1987 to 1 May 2003:

Wards from 1 May 2003 to 7 May 2015:

Wards from 7 May 2015 to present:

West Lancashire
Wards from 1 April 1974 (first election 7 June 1973) to 6 May 1976:

Wards from 6 May 1976 to 2 May 2002:

Wards from 2 May 2002 to present:

† minor boundary changes in 2007

Wyre
Wards from 1 April 1974 (first election 7 June 1973) to 3 May 1979:

Wards from 3 May 1979 to 1 May 2003:

Wards from 1 May 2003 to 7 May 2015:

Wards from 7 May 2015 to present:

Electoral wards by constituency

Blackburn

Blackpool North and Cleveleys

Blackpool South

Burnley

Chorley

Fylde

Hyndburn

Lancaster and Fleetwood

Morecambe and Lunesdale

Pendle

Preston

Ribble Valley

Rossendale and Darwen

South Ribble

West Lancashire

Wyre and Preston North

See also
List of parliamentary constituencies in Lancashire

References

Lancashire
Lancashire-related lists